Mărăcineni is a commune in the center of Buzău County, Muntenia, Romania, just north of Buzău, the county capital.

Location
Mărăcineni lies on the left bank of the river Buzău, at its exit from between the Subcarpathian Hills, only 1 km north from the city of Buzău, located on the opposite bank of the river. Mărăcineni is connected to the city via the DN2 national road, across a bridge, known as either the Buzău bridge or the Mărăcineni bridge, which is the most important road connection between Bucharest and the cities of Moldavia. This bridge was damaged by floods during the summer of 2005, and was demolished and rebuilt by November of the same year.

The commune is made up of three villages (Mărăcineni, Căpățânești and Potoceni).

Neighbours
 The commune of Săpoca, to the north-west
 The commune of Poșta Câlnău, to the north-east
 The commune of Vernești, to the south-west
 The municipality of Buzău, to the south

Politics

The mayor of the commune is Ion Catinca, from the Social Democratic Party. The Mărăcineni Local Council, elected in the 2004 local government elections, is made up of 13 councillors, with the following party composition:

History
The first document mentioning the village of Mărăcineni is a property act of November 3, 1597, by which the prince of Wallachia, Mihai Viteazul acknowledges the ownership of Fătu of Mărăcineni over a vineyard which he had recently bought.

Between 1960 and 1968, the commune was a suburb of Buzău.

International relations
Mărăcineni signed a cooperation agreement with Sèvres, France, in 1991.

Notes

Communes in Buzău County
Localities in Muntenia